Porcellio pulverulentus is a species of woodlouse in the genus Porcellio belonging to the family Porcellionidae that is endemic to mainland Spain.

References

Porcellionidae
Crustaceans described in 1885
Endemic fauna of Spain
Woodlice of Europe